Oscura Mountains, originally known to the Spanish as the Sierra Oscura, are a ridge of mountains, trending north and south, east of the Jornada del Muerto and west of the Tularosa Valley. The word oscura means "dark" and refers to the dark color of the mountains due to the Pinyon-juniper vegetation at their higher elevations. The Oscuras are located in Socorro County and Lincoln County, New Mexico.

Southwest and separated from the Oscuras by Oscura Gap are the lower-lying Little Burro Mountains. The San Andres Mountains lie beyond the Little Burro Mountains to the south and are separated from them by Mockingbird Gap. The Oscura range is bounded on the north by Wash Hale Canyon. The Oscuras slope off more gently to the east and are bounded on the northeast by the Chupadera Mesa. The Tularosa Basin to the east also has an average elevation of about 
 
The Oscura Mountains are located within the White Sands Missile Range and public access is restricted. North Oscura Peak is the location of an Air Force Research Laboratory (AFRL) site.

Climate
The Oscura Mountains are a Sky island rising above semi-arid steppe and arid desert. The higher elevations of the mountains result in cooler temperatures and higher precipitation. Surface water is rare except for ephemeral streams on the east side of the range and a few springs. Most precipitation is received between July and October.

Flora and fauna
Five vegetation types typical of New Mexico clothe the Oscura mountains. At the highest elevations is a pinyon woodland mainly on the eastern slopes and consisting mostly of two-needle pinyon. Below the pinyons in elevation on the eastern flanks is a juniper woodland interspersed with savannas. Still lower on the eastern slopes and also on the western slopes is montane scrub, consisting mostly of mountain mahogany and wavy leaf oak. Chaparral consisting mostly of shrub live oak and grassland dominated by blue gramma is found at low to mid elevations. Large animals include mule deer, black bear, and the non-native oryx.

References 

Mountains of New Mexico
Landforms of Socorro County, New Mexico
Landforms of Lincoln County, New Mexico
Mountain ranges of New Mexico
Mountain ranges of Socorro County, New Mexico
Mountain ranges of Lincoln County, New Mexico
Tularosa Basin
White Sands Missile Range